Ravshanbek Sabirov is a deputy in the Jogorku Kenesh, the parliament of Kyrgyzstan, and a member of the Ata Meken Socialist Party.  Upon his election to the Jogorku Kenesh in 2010, he became the first ethnic Tajik to sit in that body.

References

Ata Meken Socialist Party politicians
Living people
Members of the Supreme Council (Kyrgyzstan)
Ethnic Tajik people
Year of birth missing (living people)
Kyrgyzstani people of Tajik descent